Bergsdalen Church is a parish church of the Church of Norway in Vaksdal Municipality in Vestland county, Norway. It is located in the Bergsdalen valley, east of the village of Dale. It is the church for the Bergsdalen parish which is part of the Hardanger og Voss prosti (deanery) in the Diocese of Bjørgvin. The gray, stone church was built in a long church design in 1955 using plans drawn up by the architect Leiv Tvilde. The church seats about 140 people.

History
In 1902, a cemetery was built to serve the mountain valley of Bergsdalen. Nearly 50 years later, a church was built beside the cemetery so that the people of the valley did not have to travel so far to get to a church. The church was designed by Leiv Tvilde and Johannes Øvsthus was the lead builder. The stone church has a nave with a choir on the east end. There's a small sacristy extension off of the choir. The church porch is located on the west end of the nave. There is a basement under the church which houses a church hall. The new church was consecrated on 3 July 1955 by the Bishop Ragnvald Indrebø.

See also
List of churches in Bjørgvin

References

Vaksdal
Churches in Vestland
Long churches in Norway
Stone churches in Norway
20th-century Church of Norway church buildings
Churches completed in 1955
1955 establishments in Norway